Juliane Giovane (21 December 1766, in  Würzburg – August 1805, in Budapest), was a German writer, as well as a lady in waiting for Queen Maria Caroline of Naples.

Life
She married Duke Nicola Giovene di Girasole on 18 April 1786 and they had two children. Their son Carlo was born on 30 April 1787, Queen Maria Caroline was his godmother, their daughter Elisabetta died in childhood.

In 1787, she met Johann Wolfgang von Goethe in Naples and spoke to him about her desire to become a writer. She witnessed an eruption of  Mount Vesuvius and collected minerals and wrote a treatise on mineralogy. After separating from her husband in 1790 she moved to Vienna.  Her son remained in Naples and in 1796 she wrote Idèes sur la maniére de rendre les voyage des jeunes gens utils à leur propre culture... dedicated to him. Giovane made a name for herself at the Viennese court in 1795 through her writings on education and became employed as a Hofmeister in the court of the Archduchess Marie Louise, the granddaughter of Queen Maria Caroline. She was the winner of the Star Cross Order. On 16 January 1794, Frederick William II of Prussia announced she was to be included in the Prussian Academy of Sciences, becoming the second female member. She was also an honorary member of the Royal Swedish Academy of Sciences.

From 1800 to 1804 she lived in Vienna with Josephine Deym. Due to her poor health she then moved into the home of the  Brunszvik family where she died in 1805.

References

1766 births
1805 deaths
Italian ladies-in-waiting
18th-century German women writers